Paul Lob (13 July 1893 – 22 February 1965) was a Swiss ice hockey player who competed in the 1920 Summer Olympics. In 1920 he participated with the Swiss ice hockey team in the Summer Olympics tournament.

See also
List of Olympic men's ice hockey players for Switzerland

References

External links
 

1893 births
1965 deaths
Genève-Servette HC players
Ice hockey players at the 1920 Summer Olympics
Olympic ice hockey players of Switzerland
People from Riviera-Pays-d'Enhaut District
Sportspeople from the canton of Vaud
Swiss ice hockey defencemen